Cebotari is a Moldovan and Romanian surname. Notable people with the surname include:

 Boris Cebotari (1975–2012), Moldovan footballer
 Maria Cebotari (1910–1949), Romanian singer and actress
 Nicolai Cebotari (born 1997), Moldovan footballer

Surnames of Moldovan origin